Billions is an American television drama series created by Brian Koppelman, David Levien, and Andrew Ross Sorkin, starring Paul Giamatti and Damian Lewis, which premiered on Showtime on January 17, 2016.

On May 8, 2019, the series was renewed for a fifth season by Showtime, which premiered on May 3, 2020. Due to the COVID-19 pandemic, production was postponed and only 7 of the 12 episodes aired in 2020. Season 5 resumed on September 5, 2021. On October 1, 2020, Showtime renewed the series for a sixth season, which premiered on January 23, 2022. On February 15, 2022, Showtime renewed the series for a seventh season.

Series overview

Episodes

Season 1 (2016)
Showtime released the pilot episode online on January 1, 2016, and the second episode on January 17, 2016.

Season 2 (2017)

Season 3 (2018)

Season 4 (2019)

Season 5 (2020–21)

Season 6 (2022)

Ratings

References

External links 
 
 

Billions